A Friend of the Family is a 2005 Canadian TV movie based on Alison Shaw's 1998 non-fiction book of the same name. It was directed by Stuart Gillard and stars Laura Harris.

Plot
After escaping an attack in Toronto, artist Alison Shaw moves with her husband to a small rural town. They are welcomed warmly by David Snow but Alison begins to suspect that David may be a mass murderer.

Cast
 Laura Harris as Alison Shaw
 Eric Johnson as Darris Shaw
 Kim Coates as David Snow
 Sabrina Grdevich as Heidi
 Greg Lawson as Police Chief Milt Mooney
 Shaun Johnston as Coleridge
 David LeReaney as Dr. Gordean

Production
Filming took place in Alberta and Ontario, Canada.

References

External links

2005 television films
2005 films
2000s mystery films
2000s thriller drama films
2000s English-language films
Films directed by Stuart Gillard
Thriller films based on actual events
Canadian drama films
Canadian thriller television films
English-language Canadian films
Canadian mystery films
2005 drama films
Canadian films based on actual events
2000s Canadian films